Gabriel-Jules Thomas (10 September 1824 – 8 March 1905) was a French sculptor, born in Paris.

Thomas attended the École des Beaux-Arts and in 1848 he won the Prix de Rome in the sculpture category with his Philoctète partant pour le siège de Troie ("Philoctetes Leaves for the Siege of Troy") in plaster.  This piece was briefly displayed in New York City at the Dahesh Museum of Art for their 2005–2006 exhibition entitled "The Legacy of Homer."  It is normally kept at the Ecole Nationale Supérieure des Beaux-Arts in Paris.

He later taught at the Ecole.  Among his students were Gaston Lachaise.and American sculptor, August Zeller.

Works 

 Virgil, 1861, marble, Paris, Musée d'Orsay
 Mademoiselle Mars, plaster, Musée des Beaux-Arts d'Angers
 The Stoning of St. Stephen, the church of Saint-Étienne-du-Mont, Paris, 1863
 Frankfurt, 1864–1865, stone, Paris, façade for the Gare du Nord train station
 Bust of Augustin Dumont, bronze, 1877, Pont-Audemer, Musée Alfred Canel
 Memorial to Baron Taylor, Père Lachaise Cemetery, Paris, circa 1879

External links

1824 births
1905 deaths
Artists from Paris
French sculptors
French male sculptors
Prix de Rome for sculpture